Novyye Kiyeshki (Yañı Qıyışqı) is a rural locality (a selo) and the administrative centre of Novokiyeshkinsky Selsoviet, Karmaskalinsky District, Bashkortostan, Russia. The population was 16 as of 2010. There are 18 streets.

Geography 
Novyye Kiyeshki is located 29 km east of Karmaskaly (the district's administrative centre) by road. Utyaganovo is the nearest rural locality.

References 

Rural localities in Karmaskalinsky District